Homage to Qwert Yuiop (1986) — published in the United States as But Do Blondes Prefer Gentlemen? — is a collection of essays by Anthony Burgess.

Book reviews form the bulk of the content, though there are various essays and an interview Burgess conducted with Graham Greene.

Large tracts deal with the written word, especially a variety of linguistic reviews and papers, as well as a great many dictionaries, phrase books, books of quotations, etc. Burgess was widely known as a polyglot, and frequently includes linguistic anecdotes (etymology and so forth), from English, Russian, Greek, Latin and Malay.

A section of the book deals with the movie business, including histories of a variety of film stars and early Hollywood producers, about many of whom Burgess had strong opinions.

Another section is devoted to reviews of biographies of authors, including Dickens, Beckett and Hemingway. The book finishes with reviews of literature by novelists including H. G. Wells and Kingsley Amis.

The book displays the tremendous amount of knowledge Burgess had accumulated by the age of 66, especially concerning geography, travel, cultures, languages and literature.

The title of the collection is a reference to the urban legend of a Hungarian man named Qwert Yuiop, who supposedly invented the modern English keyboard layout and left his name lightly hidden in it ('qwert yuiop' are the ten letters that make up the top row of letters on a standard QWERTY keyboard).
 (1986) 

Homage to QWERT YUIOP
Essay collections
1986 books
Qwerty is the best